The Yugoslav First B Federal Basketball League was the second-tier level club basketball league of SFR Yugoslavia. The league's top performing clubs of each season, were promoted up to the top tier level, the Yugoslav First Federal League.

Winners

Adriatic League successor league
In 2017, the ABA League, which is the successor league to the Yugoslav First Federal League, created the Adriatic League Second Division, which is the successor league to the Yugoslav First B Federal League.

See also 
 YUBA B League

References

External links
KosMagazin.com Sezona 1980-81: Ćosić u Kićinoj senci 

1980 establishments in Yugoslavia
1991 disestablishments in Yugoslavia
Basketball leagues in Yugoslavia
Sports leagues established in 1980
Sports leagues disestablished in 1991
Second level basketball leagues in Europe